Paulo Roberto are given names. Notable people with these given names include:

Paulo Roberto (footballer, born 1958), Brazilian footballer
Paulo Roberto Falcão, a Brazilian retired footballer and manager
Paulo Roberto de Oliveira Júnior, a Brazilian retired footballer
Paulo Roberto Cardoso Rodrigues, a Brazilian footballer
Paulo Roberto Correia, Brazilian Olympic sprinter
Paulo Roberto Curtis Costa, a Brazilian retired footballer
Paulo Roberto Marqués Roris, a Brazilian-born Spanish futsal player
Paulo Roberto Morais Júnior, a Brazilian footballer
Paulo Roberto da Silva, a Brazilian footballer
Paulo Roberto Prestes, a Brazilian retired footballer
Paulo Roberto Paula, a Brazilian long-distance runner
Paulo Roberto da Silva Zaltron, a Brazilian footballer
Paulo Roberto do Carmo, a Brazilian footballer
Paulo Roberto Gonzaga, a Brazilian footballer